Christopher Rocky Burrous (January 11, 1975 – December 27, 2018) was an American journalist and host of the KTLA 5 Weekend Morning News in Los Angeles. He had a 20-year career in television broadcasting at various news stations before he died at age 43.

Early life
Burrous was the son of a farmer and NASA engineer. He attended Chapman University in Orange, California, and earned a broadcast journalism degree. 

While still at Chapman, he began his 20-year journalism career as a news anchor at three radio stations–KARA-FM, KLIV-AM, and KRTY-FM–all located in nearby California cities. In 1996, while still in university, Burrous joined NBC 11 KNTV as a writer and associate producer, and a year later served as morning drive talk show host on the radio for KCKC-AM/KCXX-FM.

Career 
When Burrous graduated Chapman University in 1997, he became the main news anchor at KEVN-LD in Rapid City, South Dakota. In January 1999, he moved south to KGET-TV in Bakersfield, California to become the station's morning news anchor. While there, he met Mai Do, a journalist, who became his wife.

His next move was as the morning news anchor at KGPE-TV in Fresno, California, and KMAX-TV/KOVR-TV Sacramento, California. At the latter, Burrous became anchor for the newly launched Good Day Sacramento weekend morning show that aired on the two affiliated stations. 

In 2010, Burrous moved to New York City to take an anchor job at WPIX's PIX 11 before returning to the west coast in 2011, to join WPIX sister station KTLA. There he helped expand the station's Morning News program as weekend anchor, while also doing reporting on weekdays. He had featured segments at KTLA that included "Burrous Bites", reviews of local restaurants, and "Made in California", reports on area businesses.

Death
According to a Los Angeles County coroner's report, Burrous died from methamphetamine toxicity, complicated by hypertensive and atherosclerotic cardiovascular disease on December 27, 2018. He was found unresponsive at a Glendale, California Days Inn.  It was reported that Burrous was in the company of a male companion, and had been engaged in a sexual encounter and using crystal meth at the time of his death, which he had inserted into his anus. His death was ruled an accident.

Personal life
Burrous was survived by his wife, Mai Do Burrous, a journalist he met while they were both working at KGET, and daughter, Isabella, 9 years old at the time of his death.

References

1975 births
2018 deaths
People from Santa Clara, California
Chapman University alumni
American television news anchors
American LGBT journalists
Television news anchors from California
Journalists from California